"In My Head" is a song by American rapper and singer Juice Wrld. It was released as a single on October 28, 2022, by Grade A Productions and Interscope Records. The song was produced by Tre Pounds, Max Lord, and Sheldon Ferguson, and was teased prior to its release under the title "Rush Hour."

Background
"In My Head" was first previewed by Juice Wrld on August 30, 2019, and would remain unreleased for nearly three years after his passing. On October 22, 2022, Lil Bibby, owner of Grade A Productions, began teasing the track's release under the title "Rush Hour"; on October 24, a 30-second snippet of the song was uploaded to streaming services. Lil Bibby would later reveal the track's official title in a post to Instagram, while also revealing that the title "Rush Hour" was used as a "code name ... to prevent hackers from leaking the song early".

Composition
Over a guitar-heavy, and trap-infused, production, Juice Wrld sings about his struggles with substance abuse and the various mental health issues he deals with on a day-to-day basis. The song's chorus consists of Juice Wrld singing that he often finds himself "stuck" or "trapped" in his head, usually as a means of escaping from the problems he faces in life. Throughout the song, Juice Wrld also sings that his constant use of substances only makes "the [pain] worse"; still, he manages to express hope that something will change and that in the end, everything will "all [work] out".

Music video
The official music video was directed by Steve Cannon and Chris Long and released on October 28, 2022. The video makes use of archival footage of Juice Wrld that depicts him recording music and touring at various points throughout his career; the video also features brief animated sequences of human lungs and a brain to visually depict various lyrics found throughout the song.

Charts

References

2022 singles
2022 songs
Juice Wrld songs
Songs written by Juice Wrld
Interscope Records singles